About 8 km south-east from the capital of Kathmandu, Nepal on the way to Godawari, Lalitpur, there is a historically renowned village named Harisiddhi, where the Temple of Harisiddhi is located. The temple is at the height of about 4,400 ft from the sea level, whose latitude is 270˚38' north and longitude is 850˚21' east. About 800m west from the temple, there is a river named Karmanasha (Kodku). The climate at this place is normal i.e. hot in summer and cold in winter. The temple is surrounded by the residential area. There is a pond to the south-east direction of the temple which is believed to be one of the important holy-ponds i.e. Kunda.

Derivation of the name Harisiddhi 
The village is seen to be named after the goddess Harisiddhi, whose 4-tiered temple is situated at the middle of the village. In ancient time, it has been believed that there were two giants, who went to the Kailash Parbat (the place where Lord Shiva lived) and hurt the gate-man, Nandi. Lord Shiva knew about the incident and remembered the Goddess, Chandika. The Goddess appeared immediately and killed those 2 giants as per Lord Shiva had said and is thereafter, worshipped as Harisiddhi. The word Harisiddhi has been mistakenly used. Actually, it should have been Hara (Shiva) and Siddhi (Parvati) or Harasiddhi which indicates that, a half of body is Shiva and the remaining half is Parvati; the attribute of Lord Shiva and Parvati.

About the Goddess Harisiddhi 
According to the Hindu econography, the goddess Harisiddhi has 4 hands, each carrying Damaru, Kamandal, Khadga and Kalash. As the recognition of Bhairab, Harisiddhi and Kumari, three clay-pots full of water are set in the temple towards west direction. The goddess is also renowned as Tri-Shakti, Tri-Devi, Maheswori, Amba Maa, Baishnavi and Jagdamba. According to the main priest,  the goddess Harisiddhi is the creator of the world. She created Bhairab and Kumari with her miracle power. So, she is also known as Tri-Shakti (three powered) goddess. According to Devi-Puran, though the goddess is imageless, still with her miracle power, it has been believed that she possess image and she accepts the public prayers if it is done with holy-mind and blesses people according to their wish.

Goddess Harsiddhi is established in the following places and she is worshipped as follows 
• Ujjain, India - Amba Maa 

• Dwarika, India - Baishnavi 

• Gujarat, India - Harsiddhi 

• Dolakha, Nepal - Balkumari 

• Sita Paila, Kathmandu - Harisiddhi Pith 

• Kwalkhu, Patan - Tridevi

• Dhulikhel, Kavre - Trishakti 

• Agnimath, Patan - Maheswori 

• Thaiba, Lalitpur - Jagdamba

• Harisiddhi, Lalitpur - Trishakti

Historical Background of the Temple 
The origin of this goddess is in Ujjain, India. Indian emperor 'Bikramaditya', who was also the founder of Bikram Sambat, came to Nepal with his beloved goddess Harisiddhi and established the temple of her in Baneshwor, Nepal. He then initiated the dance of gods and goddesses. After some years, the dance was discontinued. In the Lichchhavi period, (about 745 B.S.), the goddess Harisiddhi was taken to Harisiddhi village and the dance was again started. In course of time, the dance was again discontinued for some years. During the reign of King Amar Malla, the famous incantatory (Baidhya) 'Gayojuju' brought the lost dance and King Yog Narendra Malla provided certain space to continue it. The famous incantatory, Gayojuju, 'Yogendranand Rajopadhya', has been believed to be able to talk to gods and goddesses. He had started Gurukul school system at his home at that time where his pupils used to help him in households. One day, one of his pupils went to Godawari forest to collect some wood. There, he encountered a strange musical sound. He went after the sound and in the meantime reached the top of the Phulchowki forest and came across a surprising incident. He got afraid and so, went to hide in the bushes, from where, he looked at those astounding scenes of gods and goddesses coming down from the heaven, performing dance with lovely music and departing. It continued for the whole day and in the evening, it ended. The boy then came out from the bushes. He forgot his purpose of coming and so, he returned empty handed. When Guru asked him for the explanation, he put forth the whole event. Guru got anxious after hearing his pupil's words and decided to investigate about it. Next morning, he went to the venue with his pupils with full preparation and watched the happening hiding behind the bushes. Then, the Guru enclosed the area with an enchanted thread. Gods and goddesses came down to dance from heaven, but could not depart. The goddess Harisiddhi asked for the person responsible. Soon, guru came out, confessed his doings and expressed that he didn't have enough of the dance. So, he wished to watch the dance again. When Guru promised to manage everything, the goddess agreed. Guru, with some incantations, then made the gods and goddesses enter into drinking vessel (Kamandal), then wrapped the vessel with an enchanted thread and covered it with the grass. They came down the hill carrying the vessel and later on, the temple was established.

Harisiddhi Naach (The First Mask Dance of Nepal) 
Harisiddhi dance is believed to be Nepal's first mask dance. King Yog Narendra Malla provided 310 ropanies of land for daily worshipping and 294 ropanies of land for the festival of every 12 years so that, this beautiful dance could be continued. The 12 year tradition includes appointment of priests, coloring of masks, dress making, bringing of holy wood, regaining of divine power and the establishment of Kalash. It is well known that there is no any vocal and instrumental music and dramatic performance to that of Harisiddhi Naach. The dance is fantastic still. In the past, the dance used to be performed for three months continuously. People were not interested or say, they had no time to watch a long period dance which resulted descend of its value. So, later on the dance was performed within a day accumulating the main events only. So, at present, there is difficulty in understanding the nature of the dance. Nowadays, the dance is performed just two times a year; first is on Yomari Purnima and the second on Holi (Fagu Purnima). This day is the main festival of the local people when close friends and relatives are invited as guest.

Arrival of Harsiddhi from Phulchowki forest 
During the mall dynasty, there lived a famous incantatory named Gayojuju (Yogendranand Rajopadhya), he could talk with god and goddess and able to get up the death body. He had started Gurukul School in his home. His pupils helped him in household as well as learning.

One day one of his pupils went to Godawari forest to collect some wood. He heard there a strange musical sound. He went ahead listening that sound. He reached the top of the Phulchowki forest and saw the strange scene. He was afraid and had gone to hide in a bush from there, he looked those strange scene that god and goddess came down from the heaven, performed dance with lovely music and departured . The events were continued for a day long. In the evening the dance was ended. He came from the bush and forgot that he was coming to collect the wood. He came back with empty hand. When guru asked him about the empty hand, he explained the description of events he had seen in the forest. The guru was also very surprised about that. The guru was curious to know about the events. Next morning the guru with his pupils went to the venue with full preparation. They looked all circumstances hiding in a bush. The guru banned the area by raw string with incantation.

God and goddess came down to dance from heaven. But they could not departure. All of them came down and dance but no one could departure. Then goddess Harsiddhi asked who did that? Soon, Guru came out from the bush and apologizes in front of the Harsiddhi and he did so because he was not satisfied yet to watch the dance. So, he prayed to get chance to watch the dance again. The goddess said that the management is difficult to perform that dance. When the guru promised to managed the required materials Devi agreed the promise.

The guru chantedly makes the gods to enter in drinking vessel, wraps the vessel with raw string and covered with grass. They came down from the hill carrying the vessel by a pupil. When they reached at the 9 taps (Nau Dhara – place name), bottom of the hill they liked to have a rest. When they reached at Thaiba (place name), they took rest and heard pig crying. Then Devi asked to departure from that place and taken near Harsiddhi village place called Sichako (place name) from that the travel continued to Harsiddhi village place called Nibha (place name of Harisiddhi), ahead of 100 steps from that place Devi was established. Later the temple for Harsiddhi goddess is founded there.

Socio-cultural and religious aspects 
There are 29 priests appointed for the activities related to the temple and goddess. These priests are worshipped as God by the villagers. This shows the villagers faith in god in this 21st century. All the villagers are united and they do most socio-cultural and religious activities in unity. The building named Ta: Chapaa: which was nearly as old as the temple, has been rebuilt by the combined effort of all villagers. At present, a building beside the temple, which is meant for the priests, is also under reconstruction by the joint effort of the villagers. According to Ar. Raj Krishna Maharjan, the building is to be constructed in the traditional way using the locally available building materials. Their chief aim is to list the place in UNESCO's World Heritage Site. The important social and cultural activities of the village take place in front of the temple or at least, start here. Such activities include Gai Jatra, Matya, Indra Jatra Chaychi, Salcha pyaakha:, Dyo pyaakha: (Harisiddhi naach) etc. The temple is more concentrated to the Hindu religion. There are several idols of Hindu gods and goddess around the place.

Vaastushastra 
The orientation and the proportion of this temple are based on Vastu shastra. Inside, there are two idols: one facing south and the other west. According to Vaastushastra, it is believed that, while praying or worshipping the god, if a person faces north, he is blessed with wealth and if the faces east, he is blessed with education. The facing of the idols might be for some similar reasons. In the similar way, the door of the entrance is faced east.

Principles of Composition 
The temple seems symmetric on a certain axis. Perfect symmetry, in case of temple, also gives symmetry in case of distribution of mass and rigidity – equal strength to the building in response to any direction of ground wave and lateral force. Doors are not close to corners; else, strength is reduced. Tundals are repeatedly used for the support of the tiers of the temple. There are repeatedly used strips on the tiers of the temple.

Conclusion 
The temple is in good condition at present. It is among the important heritages our ancestors have left us. So, this temple is of great importance. People are aware of the importance. The repairing and the maintenance of the temple have been carried on in certain interval of time. Though the original colour of the temple has been changed by the use of modern colours, the heritage is still an example of good artwork. However, the impact and use of modern materials during the reconstruction has somehow deteriorated the originality. People are jointly involved in the protection of such heritage.

On 3rd December 2021, the statue of this deity was stolen.
Populated places in Lalitpur District, Nepal

External links 

Harisiddhi Temple by Bijju Maharjan